Papua New Guinea competed at the 2020 Summer Olympics in Tokyo. Originally scheduled to take place from 24 July to 9 August 2020, the Games were postponed to 23 July to 8 August 2021, because of the COVID-19 pandemic. It was the nation's tenth consecutive appearance at the Summer Olympics.

Competitors
The following is the list of number of competitors in the Games.

Athletics

Papua New Guinea received a universality slot from the World Athletics to send a female track and field athlete to the Olympics.

Field events

Boxing

Papua New Guinea received an invitation from the Tripartite Commission to send the men's lightweight boxer John Ume to the Olympics.

Sailing

Papua New Guinean sailors qualified one boat in each of the following classes through the class-associated World Championships, and the continental regattas, marking the country's recurrence to the sport for the first time in 28 years.

M = Medal race; EL = Eliminated – did not advance into the medal race

Swimming

Papua New Guinea received a universality invitation from FINA to send two top-ranked swimmers (one per gender) in their respective individual events to the Olympics, based on the FINA Points System of June 28, 2021.

Weightlifting

Papua New Guinea entered two weightlifters (one per gender) into the Olympic competition. Rio 2016 Olympian Morea Baru (men's 61 kg), with the veteran Dika Toua (women's 49 kg) becoming the first female from her nation to compete in five Olympics, topped the list of weightlifters from Oceania in their respective weight categories based on the IWF Absolute Continental Rankings.

References

Nations at the 2020 Summer Olympics
2020
2021 in Papua New Guinean sport